Tel Hadid is an archaeological site in Israel.

Location and landscape 

It overlooks the central coastal plain of Israel, the Lydda Valley and the Tel Aviv metropolitan area.

The local rock in this area is chalk covered by Nari (hard limestone) crust. Accelerated processes of chalk decay created many natural caves and fallen debris, commonly found in various locations at the site. Most of Tel Hadid is currently covered by olive plantations, which had been cultivated by the inhabitants of village al-Haditha, and by pine trees, which were planted by the Jewish National Fund. Remains of houses and the cemetery of al-Haditha are still noticeable on the ground.

Identification and early history of Hadid 

During early scholarship, led by Church Fathers such as Eusebius, Haditha (Greek: Άδιθά or Aδιθα) was identified as the site of Adithaim, a town in the allotment of the Tribe of Judah (Joshua 15:36). Similarly, the famous Madaba Map, features a village northwest of Jerusalem with the caption Adiathim that is now Aditha. But Adithaim is to be sought in the Judean Shephelah, and it seems that the similarity in the sounds of the toponym was behind this confusion. A different identification of Haditha suggested centuries later since was subsequently followed in scholarship. A 13th century Jewish scholar named Isaac HaKohen Ben Moses, better known by his pen name, Ishtori Haparchi, traveled seven years across the Holy Land and documented his insights on the local topography and toponomy in his book Kaftor Vaferach (Hebrew: כפתור ופרח; literally “Button and Flower”). There he wrote that the village of Haditha (Hebrew חדתא), located on top of a round hill two hours walk east of Lydda, is the place of Biblical Hadid.

Hadid is first mentioned in the books of Ezra and Nehemiah among the towns settled by those returning from the Babylonian exile. According to the 1 Maccabees, Hadid (Greek: Αδιδα) was fortified by Simon Thassi during the war with Diodotus Tryphon. The battle between those armies took place in the valley it overlooks. The strategic importance of Hadid was maintained for generations. According to Josephus, Vespasian, who led the legions against the Jewish Revolt, decided to block the ways leading to Jerusalem and chose to fortify Hadid (Άδδιδά). Lastly, a rabbinical tradition claims that Hadid was among the towns fortified during the days of Joshua.

In 1944 the village of al-Haditha had 760 inhabitants. It was captured by Israeli forces on July 12, 1948, during Operation Danny, following the conquest of Lydda and Ramle, and subsequently depopulated of its residents.

Archaeological explorations at the site 
Exploration of the site has primarily included salvage excavations. In 1940 J. Ory excavated a Byzantine-period mosaic floor, depicting a Nilotic scene. A major salvage excavation project took place in 1995–1997, during which extensive remains were unearthed across a lower terrace to the north of the high mound. According to preliminary publications, the earliest remains date to the Intermediate Bronze Age. After a settlement gap of centuries, the site was resettled during the Late Bronze Age. The settlement reached its peak in the Iron Age II, under the Kingdom of Israel and, after its downfall, under the Assyrian Empire. Additional remains were dated to the Persian Period until the Modern Era.

Within the remains of an Iron Age II settlement, two cuneiform tablets were found, and were  dated to the first half of the 7th century BCE. These two legal documents refer to individuals who bear non-local (mainly Akkadian) names, and were interpreted as members of deportee communities, brought to the country by the Neo-Assyrian Empire. A similar scenario emerges from two tablets found over a century ago at Tel Gezer, where Aramean and Akkadian names are mentioned alongside a local name – Netanyahu.

A new research project was launched in 2018, under the auspice of Tel Aviv University and the New Orleans Baptist Theological Seminary.

References

External links 
 Tel Hadid Expedition

Archaeological sites in Israel